Stomping Ground the third studio album by American punk rock band Goldfinger, released on March 28, 2000. The song "The End of the Day" contains a brief sample from the Dead Kennedys song "Nazi Punks Fuck Off." The album was produced by Tim Palmer and John Feldmann and mixed by Tim Palmer.

Release
Stomping Ground was released in March 2000. In May 2000, the band went on tour with Ignite. In March 2001, the band embarked on a tour of Europe. In July and August 2001, the band went a co-headlining tour of the US with Reel Big Fish dubbed The Crouching Fish, Hidden Finger Tour, with support from Zebrahead, Home Grown, Mest, the Movielife and Rx Bandits. A second leg of this trek occurred in September and October 2001, with support from Mest, the Movielife, and Sugarcult.

Track listing
All songs are written by John Feldmann,  except where noted.

Personnel
John Feldmann – vocals, guitar
Charlie Paulson – guitar
Dangerous Darrin Pfeiffer – drums, vocals
Kelly LeMieux – bass, vocals

References

Goldfinger (band) albums
2000 albums
Albums produced by John Feldmann
Albums produced by Tim Palmer
Albums produced by Jay Rifkin
Mojo Records albums